Charles Goodall (26 October 1782 – December 1872) was an English cricketer who played for Nottingham Cricket Club from 1813 to 1827.  He made one first-class appearance for Nottingham in 1826.

References

1782 births
1872 deaths
English cricketers
English cricketers of 1787 to 1825
English cricketers of 1826 to 1863
Nottingham Cricket Club cricketers
Cricketers from Nottingham